I Megaliteres Epitihies may refer to:

 I Megaliteres Epitihies (Mando album)
 I Megaliteres Epitihies (Marinella album)